This is a list of hospitals in Washington, D.C., as of December 2009.

Hospitals for members of the public
There are a mix of non-profit public, for-profit private, and non-profit private hospitals in the District of Columbia.  These hospitals provide care to all members of the public.
Children's National Medical Center
George Washington University Hospital
Hospital for Sick Children 
Howard University Hospital
MedStar Georgetown University Hospital
MedStar National Rehabilitation Hospital
MedStar Washington Hospital Center 
Psychiatric Institute of Washington
Sibley Memorial Hospital
Specialty Hospital of Washington - Capitol Hill
Specialty Hospital of Washington - Hadley
St. Elizabeths Hospital
United Medical Center (opened in 1966 as Cafritz Memorial Hospital; also  formerly known as Greater Southeast Community Hospital)

Military hospitals
There is one hospital within the District of Columbia which offers care solely to members of the United States military, their families, and to veterans.  This facility is owned and operated by the U.S. federal government and are generally not utilized by members of the public unless the individual falls into one of the categories served.
Washington DC Veterans Affairs Medical Center

References

Hospitals
Washington, D.C.
 
Hospitals
Washington, D.C.